The Central Organisation of Finnish Trade Unions, usually referred to by the acronym SAK is the largest trade union confederation in Finland. Its member organisations have a total of more than one million members, which makes up about one fifth of the country's population.

History
The other two Finnish trade unions confederations are the Finnish Confederation of Salaried Employees (STTK) and the Confederation of Unions for Academic Professionals in Finland (AKAVA). The most important negotiating partner of SAK is the Elinkeinoelämän keskusliitto/Finlands Näringsliv (the Confederation of Finnish Industries, EK), which represents the majority of Finnish employers.

The current SAK was founded in 1969 as the Finnish Federation of Trade Unions (SAK 1930–1969), controlled by SKDL and TPSL, and the Finnish Trade Union Federation (SAJ 1960–1969), controlled by SDP, settled their disputes and merged. The SAK, however, considers itself the continuation of the first Finnish central organisation, the Finnish Trade Union Federation (SAJ 1907–1930).

The SAK is generally supportive of the Social Democratic Party, and has spent money on advertisements backing the party.  In 2007, advertisements it placed on behalf of the SDP were found to be defaming, leading the SAK to withdraw them.

Member unions

Current

 Unions marked with "*" are affiliated to the SAK through another union, but their membership is counted separately.

Former

Presidents
1969: Niilo Hämäläinen
1974: Pekka Oivio
1981: Pertti Viinanen
1990: Lauri Ihalainen
2009: Lauri Lyly
2016: Jarkko Eloranta

External links

References

National trade union centers of Finland
International Trade Union Confederation
Trade Union Advisory Committee to the OECD
European Trade Union Confederation
Council of Nordic Trade Unions
1969 establishments in Finland
Trade unions established in 1969